Ilva S.p.A. is an Italian steel company that for much of the 20th century was Italy's largest steel producer and one of the largest in Europe. In June 2017, Arcelor Mittal became the chief shareholder. On 23 April 2021, capital was infused by the government of Mario Draghi, which took a 38% share and 50% of the voting rights.

History
Ilva was established in 1905 in Genoa and existed through the decline of European steel manufacturing during the 1970s and 1980s until its final privatization in 1995. Ilva main assets, including giant Taranto steelworks, Europe's largest, were acquired by Gruppo Riva. In 2012 Taranto steel plant was at the centre of an environmental scandal that led to the arrest and conviction of some Riva family members and the transfer of the steelworks to ArcelorMittal.

Early history (1905–1934)
The company was founded in Genoa on 1 February 1905, its namesake being the Latin name for Elba island, seat of plentiful iron ore deposits that fueled the first blast furnaces built in Italy in the late 19th century. Ilva was born from the merger of the steel activities of Siderurgica di Savona group, of Acciaierie di Terni and of its subsidiary  Ligure Metallurgica. The initial share capital of the limited company was 12 million Italian lire, that was increased to 20 million lire when Elba group joined shortly after. The new company, controlled by Genoese financers, was set up with the political and financial backing of the Italian state, in order to build the Bagnoli steel plant, as part of the 1904 law for the development of Naples, prepared by economist and later prime minister Francesco Saverio Nitti. During the First world war Ilva benefited from big state contracts, but the end of the war effort and the postwar recession, combined with the effects of the red scare of 1920-21, brought it close to bankruptcy and in 1922 Banca Commerciale Italiana assumed control of the company.

From IRI to italsider (1934–1995)

Ilva continued to struggle during the 1920s, until the 1929 crash dealt a fatal blow to the company, that in 1934 was eventually acquired by IRI, the public holding company established in 1933 by the Fascist regime to rescue, restructure and finance banks and private companies that went bankrupt during the Great Depression. Ilva thus became part of Finsider, IRI's holding specializing in steel production (that controlled also Acciaierie di Cornigliano S.p.A. steelworks, known as SIAC, and many other smaller steel companies, among which Terni Acciai Speciali S.p.A. and Dalmine S.p.A.). After the Second world war, IRI president Oscar Sinigaglia used Marshall Plan funds to rebuild and modernize SIAC steelworks in Cornigliano and merged them with Ilva in 1961, creating a new company called Italsider. The new company expanded rapidly in the 1960s. In 1965 giant Taranto integrated iron and steel complex became operational, employing 5,000 workers and adding 10.5 million tons of capacity to Italsider. However, by the early 1970s steel production in the EEC was suffering from overcapacity and foreign competition. Italsider made no exception, taking very heavy losses during steel crisis that hit all the Western economies in the late 1970s and especially in the 1980s. In 1984 Italsider sold SIAC to COGEA, a consortium of private steel companies dominated by Falck Group, that in turn resold it to Gruppo Riva in 1988. In 1992 Italsider, in a last attempt to reduce overcapacity and losses, closed Bagnoli steelworks in Naples

Gruppo Riva ownership and environmental scandal at Taranto (1995–2012) 

In 1995 the Italian state decided to get rid of loss-making Ilva and its subsidiaries. Gruppo Riva purchased the  Taranto steel plant, the German-based multinational ThyssenKrupp took over Acciai Speciali Terni S.p.A. (AST); Dalmine S.p.A. (steel pipes and tubes) was sold to Tenaris; and other plants were ceded to Gruppo Lucchini. Thus, Gruppo Riva came to own Taranto steelworks in southern Italy, Europe's largest steel plant. During a 2012 inquiry, Taranto steel plant has been found to produce elevated emissions of dioxin, correlated to abnormally high cancer incidence in the area, bringing to the seizure of the plant by the Italian state. According to the European Pollutant Emission Register, emissions of dioxin by Taranto steel plant accounted for 30.6 per cent of all emissions in Italy in 2002, and much more according to an inquiry by PeaceLink NGO.

From the commissioners to ArcelorMittal (2012–2018) 

In 2012, an investigation for environmental crimes and pollution led the Taranto prosecutor to order the seizure without the right to use the plants in the furnace area. To safeguard the establishment and employment, the Italian government has initiated the company commissioner procedure and launched an international tender for a assignment of the same.
Since January 2015, the company has been under extraordinary administration pursuant to the Marzano Law.

By March 2017, ArcelorMittal was leading a consortium bidding for Ilva. The ArcelorMittal consortium was selected as the preferred bidder over a different consortium led by JSW Steel after it was able to pledge a production increase and guarantee employment levels. The final decision was waiting on Italy’s ministry of economic development. In June 2017, the lease was agreed.

On 5 June 2017, ArcelorMittal and partners won approval to purchase Ilva for €1.8 billion. The buyers were the AM Investco consortium, which beyond ArcelorMittal included Marcegaglia and Banca Intesa Sanpaolo. In its bid, AM Investco also pledged to make investments into Ilva of €2.4 billion until 2023. The consortium's plan would cut the 14,220 jobs down to under 10,000 by 2018 and would stabilize at 8,500 by 2023.

In November 2017, the agreement had yet to be approved by the European Commission competition bureau.

ArcelorMittal Italia (2018–2020) 
ILVA is part of ArcelorMittal Group as of 1 November 2018.

On 5 November 2019 ArcelorMittal announced its intention to withdraw from the transfer agreement, returning it to Ilva, in extraordinary administration, within 30 days.

Procedures to shut down the plant were started, then on 18 November interrupted under legal and political pressure.

Return to ownership of the Italian state (2020–2021) 
In 2020 the process of returning to commissioners' management and ownership of the Italian state began, under the protection of the penal shield. The implementation of all the modernization procedures and environmental sustainability of the Taranto plant would continue.

Acciaierie d'Italia (2021–present) 
On 23 April 2021, an extraordinary meeting of shareholders approved the change of the company name of Am InvestCo Italy to Acciaierie di Italia Holding. Its subsidiaries also changed names: Arcelor Mittal Italia became Acciaierie d'Italia, Arcelor Mittal Italy Energy became AdI Energia, ArcelorMittal Italy Maritime Services became AdI Servizi Marittimi, ArcelorMittal Italy Tubular became AdI Tubiforma and ArcelorMittal Socova became AdI Socova. It was forecast at the time that, because of scheduled additional investments, in 2022 the Italian state would control 60% while ArcelorMittal would hold the balance.

See also
Steel industry in Italy
List of steel producers
List of countries by steel production
List of tallest structures in Italy

References

External links
www.gruppoilva.com

ArcelorMittal
Steel companies of Italy
Manufacturing companies based in Genoa
Steel industry of Italy